Utö is a small island in the Archipelago Sea in the Baltic sea and belongs to Finland's Pargas municipality. It is the southernmost year-round inhabited island in Finland.

Name
The name of the island, Utö, means "outer island" in Swedish.

Description
The island has a lighthouse, pilot station, a small guest harbour, a shop and a post office. The island is also known from the marine weather observations that began in 1881. Due to the remoteness of the island, the island has its own local school. In former times, the Finnish Defence Forces kept a small station on the island, but left the island in 2005. The island is also known as the first rescue station of the Estonia disaster in September 1994, and also helped rescue the survivors of the SS Park Victory sinking.

Climate 
Average snow-covered period last from 23 January to 15 March. The open sea areas around Utö are covered by ice only approximately every five years.

Utö has a humid continental climate (Dfb) with cold to mild summers and moderately cold, very long winters that last longer than nearby southern mainland Finland because of seasonal lag caused by the Baltic Sea.

See also 
 Bogskär
Märket
 Nuorgam
Virmajärvi

References

External links

 Utö Island Website 
 Utö Atmospheric and Marine Research Station

Finnish islands in the Baltic
Pargas
Landforms of Southwest Finland